This is a list of Representatives elected to the House of Representatives at the 2012 general election, held on 16 December 2012, for the Forty-Sixth election period of the House of Representatives beginning with the 182nd session of the National Diet of Japan.

Composition

Changes since the opening session 
 182nd Diet
 December 2012
 Bunmei Ibuki, LDP group→independent (elected President)
 Hirotaka Akamatsu, DPJ group→independent (elected Vice President)
 Seven TPJ group members form PLP
 Tomoko Abe, TPJ group→independent (remains TPJ member)
 Shizuka Kamei, TPJ group→independent (joins Green Wind)
 Kunio Hatoyama, independent→LDP
 183rd Diet
 May 2013
 Shingo Nishimura, JRP→independent (expelled)
 Tomohiro Ishikawa (party: New Party Daichi, group: independent) resigns
 June 2013
 Takako Suzuki  (party: New Party Daichi, group: independent) joins as Hokkaidō proportional replacement for Tomohiro Ishikawa

List of representatives elected in the general election
Note: Affiliation among representatives elected may change at any given time.



List of representatives elected in the 2012 general election as proportional replacements
 Takako Suzuki (2013 Hokkaidō PR block replacement for Tomohiro Ishikawa from the NPD list)
 Kōichirō Shimizu (Kinki PR block runner-up on the JRP list, fills seat vacated by Hideo Higashikokubaru in 2013)
 Tatsuo Kawabata (Kinki PR block runner-up on the DPJ list, fills seat vacated by Taizō Mikazuki in 2014)

Representative elected in the 2014 special election 
 Masuo Kaneko (LDP, April 2014 special election in Kagoshima's 2nd district)

References

See also
 Results of the Japanese general election, 2012 (lists Representatives elected by constituency)

Politics of Japan